Jimmy Humphries may refer to:

 Jimmy Humphreys (1894–1956), Irish hurler
 Jimmie Humphries (1889–1971), American professional baseball player, manager and executive

See also
James Humphreys (disambiguation)
Humphreys (surname)
Humphries